The Pussywillows were a group that featured Elinor Blake, Lisa Dembling and Lisa Jenio. Their recordings have appeared on the Kill the Moonlight  soundtrack, and the Rutles Highway Revisited album.

Background
The Pussywillows were originally from New York City. It consisted of three friends—Elinor Blake, Lisa Dembling and Lisa Jenio—who liked singing together girl-group style.<ref>SPIN,  November 1993 - Page 30 Pop tart, April March gets her Ye' Ye' Out</ref> With a singing style like that of 1960s groups such as  The Shangri-Las and The Ronettes, they would sing on stage wearing thrift-store dresses. The group originally had some help in its formation by Mike Chandler of the group Raunch Hands. Through Todd Abramson of the Telstar label they got some gigs, which led to them recording Spring Fever!, released on Telstar.Discogs - The Pussywillows – Spring Fever! The tracks on the album were, "The Boat That I Row", "Come On Now", "Don't Say He's Gone", "Turn Her Down", "Everyone Will Know", "My Baby Looks But He Don't Touch" and "Baby Baby (I Still Love You)". With "The Boat That I Row", the song was written by Neil Diamond and became a hit for Lulu.Brit Girls of the Sixties Volume Three: Cilla Black, Sandie Shaw & Lulu, By David Bret - - Another song they covered was "Turn Her Down". It was recorded by girl group The Cupons in the 1960s and released on the Impact label.FreeMusicLib - The Pussywillows

The group also did some recordings with Raunch Hands. A big fan of the group was Ronnie Spector who would one day have them backing her on a set of recordings.Billboard, October 25, 2003 - Page 52 Retail, The Indies By Chris Morris

Appearances
In December 1990, they played at the Funhouse in Bethlehem covering songs like Neil Diamond's "The Boat That I Row" and "My Baby Looks But He Don't Touch". In January 1991 with their backing band, which included guitarist Ward Dotson on guitar, Will Rigby on drums and Spike Priggen on bass, they played at the CBGB club in Bleecker Street, Manhattan.

Later years
Blake moved to LA and by 1991 was using the name April March.New York Rock: From the Rise of The Velvet Underground to the Fall of CBGB, By Steven Blush - Page 304 Lisa Jenio became a member of and bass player for Candypants and The Liquor Giants. 

The Pussywillows contributed background vocals to Ronnie Spector's 2003 album Something's Gonna Happen''. They sang on "Communication", "For His Love", "Something's Gonna Happen" and "Whenever You're On My Mind" which were all Marshall Crenshaw compositions.

Discography

References

American girl groups
American pop girl groups
American rock music groups
Musical trios
American musical trios
Rock music groups from New York (state)
Garage rock groups from New York (state)
Telstar Records (U.S. label) artists